Sir William Stanley KG (c. 1435 – 16 February 1495) was an English soldier and the younger brother of Thomas Stanley, 1st Earl of Derby. Stanley fought with his troops in several battles of the Wars of the Roses.

Private life
Born at Latham, Ormskirk, Lancashire, Sir William was the younger son of Thomas Stanley, 1st Baron Stanley. In 1465 he married Joan, daughter of John Beaumont, 1st Viscount Beaumont, and widow of John, Lord Lovel. Following the execution of her second husband the Earl of Worcester, Sir William married secondly, c.1471, Elizabeth Hopton, daughter of Thomas Hopton with whom he had a daughter, Jane Stanley. They lived at Holt, Wrexham.

Career
William Stanley fought on the Yorkist side at the Battle of Blore Heath in 1459, whereas his elder brother Thomas, Lord Stanley had raised troops by the commission of the Lancastrian Crown but refrained from committing his forces on either side. Attainted in 1459, he fled into exile, but returned to fight for the Yorkists in 1461 at Towton. In 1465 he was granted the Skipton lands and castle of the dispossessed Lancastrian Cliffords. Following the Battle of Tewkesbury in 1471, it was he who captured Queen Margaret of Anjou, who led the Lancastrian faction, and he was made a Knight Banneret by the king. In 1483 he was made Chief Justice of North Wales. Richard III, shortly after becoming king, rewarded Sir William by granting him land in North Wales.

Having been loyal to Richard, Stanley nevertheless changed sides in 1485, and suddenly supported the Lancastrian Henry Tudor's bid for the throne. Stanley is best known for his action at the Battle of Bosworth, where he decisively attacked the Yorkists under Richard, helping to secure Henry VII's victory. This was in contrast to the non-committal attitude of his elder brother, Henry's stepfather, who was inhibited by the fact that Richard held his son hostage. In gratitude for his timely intervention, the new king bestowed many favours on Sir William, including the post of Lord Chamberlain and Chamberlain of the Exchequer.

However, in 1495 Stanley was convicted of treason and executed for his support of the pretender Perkin Warbeck. Though the evidence was circumstantial, he admitted the offence in the hope that through a full confession he would escape execution. The King, partly to avoid antagonizing his mother and stepfather, was at first inclined to spare Sir William's life. Yet ultimately the King feared that by showing clemency, he would be endangering himself through encouraging other potential conspirators. As a consequence, Sir William was condemned to death, and a few days later, beheaded.

Letitia Elizabeth Landon's poetical illustration Sir William Stanley, to the heading portrait above, tells his story.

In popular culture

Sir William Stanley appears as a character in three episodes of the 1972 BBC television series about the reign of Henry VII, The Shadow of the Tower, played by John Franklyn-Robbins.

In the 2017 Starz miniseries The White Princess, Stanley is portrayed by Guy Williams.

Notes

References
257

1430s births
1495 deaths
People from Lytham St Annes
Knights of the Garter
People of the Wars of the Roses
15th-century soldiers
English soldiers
15th-century English people
William
People executed under the Tudors for treason against England
Executed people from Lancashire
People executed by Tudor England by decapitation
People executed under Henry VII of England
Executions at the Tower of London
Knights banneret of England
English politicians convicted of crimes
Younger sons of barons